Tetuán is a district of Madrid, Spain.

Geography

Subdivision

History

Some authors link the origin of the neighborhood to the camp, which would have acquired permanent structures as well as shops over time.
The area was renamed  ("Tetouan of the Victories"), after Tetouan, the Moroccan city where the victorious soldiers had come from.
Other authors claim that there were earlier buildings on the area.

The current district also comprises part of the territory of the former municipality of Chamartín de la Rosa, annexed by the municipality of Madrid in 1948.

The community is culturally diverse, with significant populations of African and South American immigrants, although Filipinos constitute the largest foreign population group in the district. Filipinos form the largest immigrant group in four of the district's six neighborhoods (Bellas Vistas, Berruguete, Castillejos and Cuatro Caminos), and the majority of Madrid's Filipino community lives in the district.

Architecture 
Some areas of Tetuán have old and modest housing, characterised by one or two storeys and a rural appearance. 
The older ones are in a popular Neo-Mudéjar style with decorations in brick.
They were self-built by masons who brought home a cheaper version of the techniques they were paid to apply in the then-building Ensanche of Madrid.
Those areas are contrasted by the business area of AZCA (Cuatro Caminos neighborhood), located in the southeastern corner of the district, and that features skycrapers such as the Torre Picasso. Many neighbors frame the contrast in terms of a dichotomy lined up along the calle de Bravo Murillo: East of the street–rich; West of the street–poor.

Tetuán hosts the Madrid Central Mosque, the oldest and one of the two most important mosques in Madrid along the M-30 mosque.

References
Citations

Bibliography

External links

 Aquí Tetuán

 
Districts of Madrid